Arbor Lakes is a commercial and residential district located in downtown Maple Grove, Minnesota, United States. Construction of Arbor Lakes began in the late 1990s with a simulacrum of a traditional American Main Street designed in neotraditional style. The second phase (completed in 2003) included the Shoppes at Arbor Lakes, Minnesota's first lifestyle center, which includes neotraditional elements. The fourth phase, The Village at Arbor Lakes, which will be  when completed, will include a  Home2 Suites by Hilton hotel, a SpringHill Suites hotel, up to 700 apartments, and some retail.

History
The land now occupied by the Arbor Lakes district was formerly an active gravel mine owned primarily by C.S. McCrossan and Tiller Corporation. The City of Maple Grove first began planning for a civic center in the late 1980s, as identified in former comprehensive land use plans.

A special gravel mining area (GMA) report was conducted in the 1990s to analyze the socio-economic feasibility of such a project. Construction on Arbor Lakes began in 1997 with the Main Street district.

The gravel mines east of Arbor Lakes are still active.

Residential
Land located in the northern part of Arbor Lakes, which was once land for a master-planned community named HighGrove, built by now defunct Rottlund Homes. The remaining land will be developed by Mattamy Homes, a Canadian building company who renamed the neighborhood, HighGrove at Arbor Lakes. A senior housing building titled, Arbor Lakes Senior Living, is

Residential neighborhoods

Features

Main Street 

Main Street and its accompanying anchors represent the inceptive phase of Arbor Lakes, beginning in 1997.  Largely unchartered in suburban environments, city planners worked closely with developers to pioneer a relatively dense, urban commercial and residential district in the geographic heart of the city.  Main Street runs north-south near the west end of the Arbor Lakes district, intersecting Elm Creek Boulevard at the south and Weaver Lake Road at the north.

Unlike more traditional, historic "main streets" (which grew little by little over the course of several decades), Maple Grove's Main Street was built over an approximate five-year time span, from 1997 to 2001.  Main Street is surrounded by junior anchors (e.g., Byerly's, Babies R Us, JoAnn Etc., Sports Authority) and other retail/restaurants (e.g., Olive Garden, Buca di Beppo).

The Main Street district is directly adjacent to the Great River Energy headquarters, which is located just east of Main Street.  Great River Energy relocated its headquarters from Elk River to Maple Grove in 2008, constructing what became Minnesota's first Platinum LEED building.  The facility incorporates many "green" technologies such as a  wind turbine, photovoltaic cells, rain gardens, rainwater re-use, green/recycled building materials, and so on.

North of Main Street is Maple Grove's public library and a Lifetime Fitness location.

The Shoppes at Arbor Lakes 

The Shoppes at Arbor Lakes is a  lifestyle center located at the intersection of Hemlock Lane and Elm Creek Boulevard in Maple Grove, Minnesota.  The mall was designed by KKE Architects of Minneapolis and developed by Opus Northwest in collaboration with Red Development. The center opened September 12, 2003.  The Shoppes are designed to have the look and feel of a traditional Main Street.  Unlike a regional mall, which would have anchor tenants (generally department stores such as Macy's or Nordstrom), the lifestyle center aims to have smaller, boutique-style stores.

In keeping with the lifestyle center tradition, the Shoppes at Arbor Lakes is made up of mainly upscale national chains such as Pottery Barn, Williams Sonoma, Brooks Brothers, P.F. Chang's China Bistro, Banana Republic, Talbots, Express, Lane Bryant, Victoria's Secret, The Gap, and American Eagle.

Local stores also have a presence at the Shoppes.  Hot Mama, which also has a location at Edina's 50th & France shopping district, Francesca's Collections, and GoodThings represent the local presence at the Shoppes.

The primary target markets for lifestyle centers such as the Shoppes are affluent women and youth.  These demographic groups also happen to have the most purchasing power in the United States of America.

In 2005, Opus and Red Development worked to open Woodbury Lakes in Woodbury, Minnesota, an eastern suburb that shares similar demographics with Maple Grove.  In October 2009, Woodbury Lakes went into bankruptcy but remains open to the public.

The Fountains at Arbor Lakes 

Junior anchors include national chains such as REI, Dick's Sporting Goods, DSW and Marshall's. Anchors include Lowe's, Costco, a Venetian-themed Holiday Inn and Suites with  indoor water park, Courtyard by Marriott and a  Dave and Buster's entertainment facility and restaurant. The shopping center also features at its main entrance a Main Street simulacrum, which is designed to inspire an urban, pedestrian-friendly coexistence with vehicular traffic.

The retail center has several small land parcels available for development, while the majority of the center is leased.

The Village at Arbor Lakes 
As part of the most recent phase of the Arbor Lakes regional commercial center, The Village at Arbor Lakes will feature up to 700 apartment units among four high-density buildings, two hotels, one of them a 128-room SpringHill Suites Hotel, the other one a 108-room Home2 Suites room, and a pair of multi-tenant buildings. Plans for development in this area had been changing since 2007, with the first proposed development, the Reflections at Arbor Lakes, falling apart due to the Great Recession, and two other projects, one of them being called the Point at Arbor Lakes, being turned down in 2014.  The Maple Grove City Council approved "The Village at Arbor Lakes" in April 2016, with construction starting two months later.

References

External links
The Shoppes at Arbor Lakes official website
Arbor Lakes Business Listing website

Shopping malls in Minnesota
Maple Grove, Minnesota
Shopping malls in Hennepin County, Minnesota
Lifestyle centers (retail)